The Isle of Wight Primary Care Trust was the NHS primary care trust (PCT) covering the Isle of Wight.

The PCT also provided ambulance and community services from the island's only hospital, St Mary's Hospital.

It was abolished in April 2013 and its service provision taken over by the Isle of Wight NHS Trust.

See also 
 St Mary's Hospital, Isle of Wight
 Isle of Wight NHS Trust

Defunct NHS trusts
Health on the Isle of Wight
Organisations based on the Isle of Wight